The 2019–20 CSA 4-Day Franchise Series was a first-class cricket competition that took place in South Africa from October 2019 to April 2020. Lions were the defending champions.

On 16 March 2020, Cricket South Africa suspended all cricket in the country for 60 days due to the COVID-19 pandemic. On 24 March 2020, Lions were named as the winners of the tournament, following the recommendations of Graeme Smith, the acting Director of Cricket.

Points table

Fixtures

Round 1

Round 2

Round 3

Round 4

Round 5

Round 6

Round 7

Round 8

Round 9

Round 10

References

External links
 Series home at ESPN Cricinfo

South African domestic cricket competitions
CSA 4-Day Franchise Series
2019–20 South African cricket season
CSA 4-Day Franchise Series
CSA 4-Day Franchise Series